This is a list of shopping malls in Kenya.

Nairobi Metropolitan Region
Nairobi Metropolitan region comprises Nairobi, Kiambu, Machakos, Kajiado and parts of Murang'a County.

Nairobi City County

 Mountain View Mall - Waiyaki Way
The Waterfront Karen
 The Junction Mall
 Thika Road Mall (TRM) - Kasarani
Nyang Digital Inc
 Capital Centre - Mombasa Road
 Diamond Plaza I & II - 4th Parklands Avenue 
 The Crossroads Mall - Karen 
 Galleria Mall - Karen-Langata Road
 Garden City Shopping Complex - Kasarani
 The Gift Mall
 The GreenHouse Mall - Ngong Road
 Greenspan Mall Donholm
 Highway Mall - Mombasa Road
 The Hub Karen - Karen
 Karen Shopping Centre - Karen
 The Hub Karen Mall - Nairobi
 The Mall - Westlands
 Mountain Mall - Kasarani
 Nakumatt Lifestyle 
 The Point - Buruburu
 Prestige Plaza - Ngong road
 Sarit Centre - Westlands
 Shujaa Mall - Spine Road
 K-Mall - Komarock (off Kangundo Road)
 T-Mall - Nairobi West 
Taj Shopping Mall - Embakasi Demolished 
 The Village Market - Gigiri
 Nextgen Mall - Mombasa Road
 Westgate Shopping Mall 
 Yaya Centre - Hurlingham
 The Lavington Mall - Lavington
 The Southfield Mall - Embakasi
 The Ciata City Mall, Ridgeways
 Two Rivers Mall at The Two Rivers Social City - Limuru Road / Northern Bypass

Kiambu County
 Ananas Mall, Thika
 Flame Tree Park - Makongeni Thika
 Juja City Mall
Kamindi Self Ridges - Kiambu (East) Town
Cleanshelf Supermarket - Kiambu (East) Town
Twiga Mart Supermarket - Kiambu (East) Town
 Smart Home Supermarket - Kiambu (East) Town
 KU Unicity Mall (upcoming)
 Nakumatt Ridgeways
 Spur Mall, Ruiru
 Tuskys' Mall - Section 9 Thika
 Ushirika Mall - Limuru
Online 237 : Home onlinemall- Thika

Machakos County
 The Digital Mall - Mlolongo
 The Crystal Rivers Mall - Mlolongo
 Gateway Mall - Syokimau
 Kiambaa Mall (Naivas Supermarket) - Machakos town
 The Masaa (Mulleys Supermarket)
 Signature Mall - Sabaki

Kajiado County
 Maasai Mall - Ongata Rongai
 Milele Mall - Ngong 
 Red Heron Mall- Kitengela
Eastmatt Supermarket Kajiado town
Masai Stores Kajiado town
Kitengela Mall

Meru and surrounding counties
Greenwood City - Under construction in Meru town centre. Largest Mall and integrated development in all of the greater Central and Eastern Kenya

Coastal Kenya

 Cinemax Plaza
 City Mall - Nyali
 Mtwapa Mall - Mtwapa
 Nyali Centre  - Nyali
 Nakumatt Diani
 Oasis Mall - Malindi 
 Planet Bamburi

Nyanza

Kisumu County
 City Mall - CBD
 Dubai Shopping Mall - Nyamasaria
 Format Mall - CBD
 LBDA Shopping Complex - Mamboleo (under construction)
 Mega City - Nyamasaria
 Mega Plaza
 Mini Mall - CBD
 The Swan Centre - CBD
 United Mall - CBD
 West End - CBD

Rift Valley Region Kenya

Naivasha Town
 Buffalo Mall
Jubilee Mall

Nakuru County
 Naivas super centre Mall
 Rivanas Arena
 Tapoos Complex
 Westside Mall
 Imani Shopping Mall
tuskys mall
 Golden life mall
 Jennifer Riria hub
Great rift mall (Under construction)

Eldoret Town
 Unimall
 The Eldo Center
 Komora Centre
 Taj Mall
 Zion Mall
 Barng'etuny Plaza
 Rupa's Mall
 Highlands Mall
 Paradise mall

Kitale Town
 Mega Centre
Khetia's Shopping Mall

Nanyuki Town
 Cedar Mall
 Nanyuki Mall

Kericho Town
 Green Square Mall
 Simba mall

North Eastern Kenya

Garissa County
 Garissa Mall

References

External links
Shopping mall index at Experience Kenya website

Kenya
Shopping malls